Matthew "Spider" Burton (born 19 May 1970) is a retired Australian rules footballer. He played as a ruckman and began his Football career at Subiaco. "Spider" Burton, as he's commonly known, because of his  frame, was formerly the AFL's tallest player. He has since been eclipsed by another Docker in Aaron Sandilands, Western Bulldogs' Peter Street, Collingwood’s Mason Cox and Ned Reeves, all of whom stand at 211 cm tall.

West Coast
Selected by West Coast with pick #36 in the 1990 National Draft, Burton spent four seasons on the Eagles' senior list before he was eventually delisted (without playing a game for the club) at the end of the 1994 season (under an AFL ruling that clubs cut list numbers back from 52 to 40).

Fremantle Dockers
In 1994, Fremantle picked up Burton in the pre-season draft. He played in Fremantle's first match in the AFL. In 1999, he was made vice-captain of the club but played only seven games that year before being delisted.

Kangaroos
In 1999, Burton was picked by the Kangaroos with selection 74 in the pre-season draft. He retired in 2003 having played a total of 147 games.

External links

1970 births
Living people
Fremantle Football Club players
Subiaco Football Club players
North Melbourne Football Club players
People educated at Newman College, Perth
Australian rules footballers from Perth, Western Australia
Western Australian State of Origin players